Chaldi Da Naam Gaddi is a comedy-drama series that premiered on 16 November 2007 on Zee TV. The show was based on the story of a Punjabi family who faced many ups and downs to keep alive their tradition of performing arts.

Plot
The Kapoor family runs a caravan called "Bhatinda Express" and each and every family member is part of it. They travel throughout the country and perform the acts at which they are best. Because of their popularity among all generations, people across all regions come to see their show.

Besides the art performance, the story also deals with life and individual aspects of all the characters that are part of this caravan.

Like any story, this ludicrous family also faces many obstacles, especially when the caravan lands into a big problem and the family has no option except to stay together and save themselves and their "Gaddi".

Cast
Suhasini Mulay ... Veeravali
Jheel Mehta ...Priyanka
Ravi Gossain ... Balwant
Ruby Oza ... Kuljeet
Pradeep Joshi ... Inder
Mannat Kaur ... Heeroo
Dakssh Ajit Singh ... Parmeet
Bhamini Oza ... Bhairavi
Ather Habib ... Dharam
Sandeep Kaur ... Soni
Ashiesh Roy ... Das Gupta
Parth Kapoor ... Champak Bhai
Shankar Anand ... Sampak Bhai
 ... Daku Kaaliya

References

External links
Official Site

2007 Indian television series debuts
2008 Indian television series endings
Zee TV original programming
Indian television soap operas